Hollyoaks Favourites is a British television series that began airing on E4 from 29 March 2020. The series shows past episodes of Channel 4 soap opera Hollyoaks, and was launched as a response to production on Hollyoaks being suspended due to the COVID-19 pandemic, in order to fill the slot of new episodes. The series will conclude on 15 January 2021, when the series returns to transmitting five weekly episodes.

Production
On 22 March 2020, Channel 4 suspended production and filming of Hollyoaks due to the COVID-19 pandemic. A decision was made to air classic episodes from 30 March, new episodes being broadcast was reduced from five to three, airing on Monday, Tuesday and Wednesday. However, on 6 April, this was reduced again from three to two, airing Monday and Tuesday. 

The slots were known as Hollyoaks Favourites and each show is presented by a cast member that their character was key to the episode. Once there are enough episodes of Hollyoaks filmed, Hollyoaks Favourites will be replaced by Hollyoaks as it was intended to be a stopgap during the pandemic. In July 2020, Hollyoaks Favourites was replaced by Hollyoaks@25, a series that explores moments from the first 25 years of the soap.

Episodes

References

External links

 
2020s British television soap operas
2020 British television series debuts
2021 British television series endings
2020s British LGBT-related drama television series
British teen drama television series
British television soap operas
Domestic violence in television
Gay-related television shows
Lesbian-related television shows
Murder in television
Social realism
Rape in television
Teenage pregnancy in television
Television series by All3Media
Television shows set in Cheshire
E4 (TV channel) original programming
English-language television shows